Vellachi is a 2013 Indian Tamil-language romance film written and directed by Velu Vishwanath. The film stars Pintu and Suchitra Unni. It was released on 1 March 2013.

Cast 
 Pintu as Ganesh
 Suchitra Unni as Vellachi
 Ganja Karuppu
 Pandu
 Chevvazhai
 Krishnamoorthy
 Madhumaran
 E. Ramesh
 G. Yadeshwaran

Production 

Vellachi was written and directed by Velu Vishwanath, and produced by Ambur K. Ananthan Naidu under Geethalaya Movies. The film marked the acting debut of actor Pandu's son Pintu. Cinematography was handled by Sai Natraj. Principal photography began in June 2012, taking place in locations like Vellore, Vaniyambadi, Palamathi, Yelagiri, and Krishnagiri. As of December 2012, the film was in post-production.

Soundtrack 
The soundtrack was composed by Bhavatharini. It marked her return to music composing after Ilakkanam (2006).

Release and reception 
Vellachi was released on 1 March 2013. Maalai Malar wrote that though the opening scenes were moving slowly, the latter part of the story was fast paced with love and conflict. The critic also appreciated Sai Natraj's cinematography, and the songs composed by Bhavatharini. Sidharth Varma from The Times of India wrote, "Tamil films with rural themes have helped several debutants make a mark, but sadly Vellachi does not work for comedian Pandu's son Pintu. For, the movie suffers from several inconsistencies in the script and pacing."

References

External links 
 

2010s Tamil-language films
2013 films
Indian romance films
2013 romance films
Films scored by Bhavatharini